Lucius Lucretius Tricipitinus was a Roman senator in the fifth century BC, and was consul with Titus Veturius Geminus Cicurinus in 462 BC.

Family
Tricipitinus was the son of a Titus Lucretius, and grandson of Titus Lucretius Tricipitinus, consul in 508 and 504 BC. His complete name was Lucius Lucretius T.f. T.n. Tricipitinus.

Biography

Consulship
In 462 BC, he was elected consul with Titus Veturius Geminus Cicurinus. The Romans recovered from a severe epidemic that occurred the year before and had taken the two consuls Publius Servilius Priscus Structus and Lucius Aebutius Helva, the augurs Titus Verginius Tricostus Rutilus and Manius Valerius Volusus Maximus, and the Curio Maximus Servius Sulpicius Camerinus Cornutus. Before the end of his consulship, a series of interreges were nominated in order to organize new elections. This they conducted during the term of the interrex, Publius Valerius Poplicola in 462 BC.

War against the Aequi and the Volsci
The Aequi and Volsci attempted to take advantage of the consequences of the epidemic and attacked the territories of Rome and the Hernici. Geminus easily put the Volsci to flight while Lucius Lucretius inflicted a serious defeat against the pillagers, recovering the loot that they had taken from Roman territory. For these victories, Lucius Lucretius was given the honor of celebrating a triumph and Geminus was given an Ovation.

The rogatio Terentilia 

When the consuls were absent from Rome, leading their armies in campaign against the Aequi and the Volsci, Terentilius, tribune of the plebs, proposed a law creating a special commission charged with regulating consular power. Quintus Fabius Vibulanus, named Praefectus urbi in absence of the consuls, opposed drafting the law and deferred the vote until the return of the consuls.

The trial of Kaeso Quinctius

The following year, in 461 BC, Tricipitinus intervened in support of the young politician, Caeso Quinctius, who was accused by the plebeian tribunes Aulus Verginius and Marcus Volscius Fictor of undermining the sacrosanctness of their office and murder.

Later career 
Lucretius was himself appointed Praefectus urbi in 459 BC, most likely because both consuls Quintus Fabius Vibulanus and Lucius Cornelius Maluginensis Uritinus, were occupied with wars against the Aequi and Volsci.

References

Bibliography

Ancient bibliography
 Dionysius of Halicarnassus, Roman Antiquities, Book IX
 Livy, The History of Rome, Book III

Modern bibliography
 
 

5th-century BC Roman consuls
Tricipitinus, Lucius